David Lorrimer (16 January 1865 – 12 November 1925) was an English cricketer.  Lorrimer was a right-handed batsman.  He was born at Leicester.

Lorrimer made his first-class debut for Leicestershire against Warwickshire in 1894 at Grace Road (a match in which his brother, Alexander, also made his first-class debut).  He made eight further first-class appearances for the county, the last of which came against Dublin University in 1895.  In his nine matches he scored 194 runs at an average of 12.12, with a high score of 46.

He died at Boscombe, Hampshire, on 12 November 1925.

References

External links
David Lorrimer at ESPNcricinfo
David Lorrimer at CricketArchive

1865 births
1925 deaths
Cricketers from Leicester
English cricketers
Leicestershire cricketers